Episcythrastis tabidella is a species of moth in the  family Pyralidae. It is found in Spain, France, Albania, North Macedonia, Bulgaria and Turkey and on Sardinia and Corsica.

References

External links
lepiforum.de

Moths described in 1864
Phycitini
Moths of Europe